The São Paulo Museum of Modern Art, (Portuguese: Museu de Arte Moderna de São Paulo, or MAM), is located in Ibirapuera Park, São Paulo.

Founded by Francisco Matarazzo Sobrinho and Yolanda Penteado, and built in 1948, the museum is modelled on the Museum of Modern Art in New York City. The Museum has a collection and includes more than 4,000 works by artists such as Anita Malfatti, Alfred Barye, Aldo Bonadei, Alfredo Volpi, Emiliano Di Cavalcanti, José António da Silva, Joan Miró, Marc Chagall, Mario Zanini, and Pablo Picasso.

Among those who studied at the museum was painter Sylvia Martins.

References

External links
 
Virtual tour of the São Paulo Museum of Modern Art provided by Google Arts & Culture

Art museums and galleries in Brazil
Modern art museums
Museums in São Paulo
Art museums established in 1948
1948 establishments in Brazil
Tourist attractions in São Paulo